Austrian Postal Savings Bank
Croatian Postal Savings Bank
Greek Postal Savings Bank
India Post Payments Bank
Philippine Postal Savings Bank
Postal Savings Bank of China
Tanzania Postal Bank

See also 
 Postal savings system
 Postbank (disambiguation)